The 3rd Parliament of Lower Canada was in session from January 8, 1801, to June 13, 1804. Elections to the Legislative Assembly in Lower Canada had been held in June 1800. All sessions were held at Quebec City.

References

External links 
  Assemblée nationale du Québec (French)
Journals of the House of Assembly of Lower Canada ..., John Neilson (1801)

03
1801 establishments in Lower Canada
1804 disestablishments in Lower Canada